Peter G. Callas (February 15, 1926 – December 30, 2022) an American politician and educator. He was a member of the Maryland House of Delegates, representing District 2B from 1983 to 1994.

Early life
Peter G. Callas was born on February 15, 1926, in Hagerstown, Maryland. He graduated from Western Maryland College (now McDaniel College) in 1949 with a Bachelor of Arts in history and in 1955 with a Master of Education. While at Western Maryland College, Callas played soccer. He received a diploma from Stockholm University in 1950. He attended Columbia University, and graduated from George Washington University with a Doctor of Education in 1972. His dissertation at George Washington University was titled "A Descriptive Analysis of Appalachian Voluntary Regional Educational Service Agencies".

Career
Callas served in the U.S. Navy in the South West Pacific theatre of World War II from 1944 to 1946. He also served in the Korean War from 1951 to 1952.

Callas worked as a school administrator. He was also an adjunct professor at George Washington University. He also taught at Western Maryland College, West Virginia University and Hagerstown Junior College. He was an education consultant in Northern Nigeria from 1965 to 1967 with Washington County's Modern Aids to Education project. He was president of the Selective Service Board in 1975. He was a member and elected as president of the Washington County Board of Education from 1978 to 1982.

Callas served in the Maryland House of Delegates, representing District 2B from 1983 to 1994. He served as a Democrat.

Personal life and death
Callas was married to Margaret (died 2007).

Callas died on December 30, 2022, at the age of 96.

Legacy
In 2008, Callas established a scholarship fund at McDaniel College, in the name of him and his wife.

References

1926 births
2022 deaths
Politicians from Hagerstown, Maryland
Military personnel from Maryland
School board members in Maryland
Western Maryland College alumni
Stockholm University alumni
George Washington University alumni
George Washington University faculty
McDaniel College people
West Virginia University faculty
United States Navy personnel of World War II
United States Navy personnel of the Korean War
Democratic Party members of the Maryland House of Delegates
20th-century American politicians